Reservation ALOHA, or R-ALOHA, is a channel access method for wireless (or other shared channel) transmission that allows uncoordinated users to share a common transmission resource. Reservation ALOHA (and its parent scheme, Slotted ALOHA) is a schema or rule set for the division of transmission resources over fixed time increments, also known as slots. If followed by all devices, this scheme allows the channel's users to cooperatively use a shared transmission resource—in this case, it is the allocation of transmission time.

Reservation ALOHA is an effort to improve the efficiency of Slotted ALOHA. The improvements with Reservation ALOHA are markedly shorter delays and ability to efficiently support higher levels of utilization. As a contrast of efficiency, simulations have shown that Reservation ALOHA exhibits less delay at 80% utilization than Slotted ALOHA at 20–36% utilization.

The chief difference between Slotted and Reservation ALOHA is that with Slotted ALOHA, any slot is available for utilization without regards to prior usage. Under Reservation ALOHA's contention-based reservation schema, the slot is temporarily considered "owned" by the station that successfully used it. Additionally, Reservation ALOHA simply stops sending data once the station has completed its transmission. As a rule, idle slots are considered available to all stations that may then implicitly reserve (utilize) the slot on a contention basis.

See also
Channel access method
Dynamic bandwidth allocation
General Packet Radio Service
Media Access Control

References

 Roberts, L.G. "ALOHA Packet System with and without Slots and Capture" ARPA Network Information Center, Stanford Research Institute, Menlo Park, California, ASS Note 8 (NIC 11290), June 1972
 ALOHA simulations
 
 Milosh Ivanovich , Moshe Zukerman , Fraser Cameron, A study of deadlock models for a multiservice medium access protocol employing a Slotted Aloha signalling channel, IEEE/ACM Transactions on Networking (TON), v.8 n.6, p.800-811, Dec. 2000
 Performance Evaluation of R-ALOHA in Distributed Packet Radio Networks with Hard Real-time Communications (1999) Te-Kai Liu, J. Silvester, A. Polydoros
 Analysis of Priority R‐ALOHA (PR‐ALOHA) protocol, Alsbou, Nesreen and Prigent, Sylvain and Refai, Hazem H., Wireless Communications and Mobile Computing 15 (4), 716-725, 2015